Poconé is a municipality in the state of Mato Grosso in the Central-West Region of Brazil. The Bento Gomes River passes within a few kilometers of the village.

The municipality contains part of the Taiamã Ecological Station.
The municipality contains 57% of the  Encontro das Águas State Park, created in 2004.

See also
List of municipalities in Mato Grosso

External links

Pantanal Escapes - Travel Guide and tourist information for Poconé

References

Municipalities in Mato Grosso